Essex Village Historic District is a national historic district located at Essex in Essex County, New York. The district contains 150 contributing buildings.  It encompasses the historic core of the hamlet of Essex and primarily contains early-19th-century buildings.  The predominant building materials are clapboarded wood frame, brick, and stone and none of the buildings exceed  stories in height.  The oldest documented structure is Dower House, built prior to 1793.  Other notable buildings include Wright's Inn (1798), Essex Free Library (1818), and "Hickory Hill" (1822), "Rosslyn" (ca. 1830), the "Old Brick Schoolhouse" (1830), and "Greystone" (1853).

It was listed on the National Register of Historic Places in 1975.

References

Historic districts on the National Register of Historic Places in New York (state)
Federal architecture in New York (state)
1793 establishments in New York (state)
National Register of Historic Places in Essex County, New York